John Bowman Thomas (July 14, 1925 – September 13, 2018) was a noted American electrical engineer, educator, and a professor at Princeton University. He received his Ph.D. from Stanford University in 1955. He was the adviser of numerous outstanding scientists including Vincent Poor, Jack Wolf, Abraham H. Haddad, Dag Tjøstheim, Hisashi Kobayashi, Bob Kahn, Eugene Wong, and Oscar C. Au. His PhD adviser was Willis W. Harman, a President of IONS.

Notes 

1925 births
American electrical engineers
Stanford University School of Engineering alumni
Princeton University faculty
2018 deaths